The UCI Cycling Esports World Championships is a world championships for online bicycle road racing organized by the Union Cycliste Internationale (UCI). The first edition was held on 9 December 2020, featuring a men's and women's event over a virtual 50 kilometer route with 483 meters of simulated elevation gain on the Zwift platform. The event featured strict anti-cheating protocols as well as 11 power ups that competitors could use during the race.

The 2022 UCI Cycling Esports World Championships took place on February 26, 2022, once again on Zwift. WTRL hosted several open Continental pre-qualifiers during November 2021 where the best were invited to join the invite only Continental Qualifiers.

Winners

Men

Women

Hosts

All Medals
Updated after 2023 UCI Cycling Esports World Championships.

References

External links 
 
 2020 UCI Cycling Esports World Championships at Zwift

Esports World Championships
Recurring sporting events established in 2020
World championships in esports